The Commander of the Azerbaijani Air Force is the head of the aviation and the administrative head in the Azerbaijani Air Force, and is under the Chief of the General Staff and the Minister of Defence. The current Commander of the Air Force is Lieutenant General Ramiz Tahirov.

List of commanders

References

Azerbaijani Air Forces personnel
Azerbaijani generals
1991 establishments in Azerbaijan
Azerbaijan